WCK may refer to:

 Windward Caribbean Kulture, a band in Dominica
 WCK, a former radio station operated by former department store Stix Baer & Fuller, St. Louis, Missouri, USA
 Wick railway station, UK National Rail code WCK
 Wild Cartoon Kingdom, a defunct magazine
 World Central Kitchen, a non-profit, non-governmental organization